Nysius aa is a species of wēkiu bug (a type of seed bug in the genus Nysius) endemic to the area around the summit of Mauna Loa, on the island of Hawaii. It is closely related to Nysius wekiuicola, which is another species of wēkiu bug endemic to the nearby Mauna Kea.

References

Mauna Loa
aa
Insects of Hawaii
Endemic fauna of Hawaii
Insects described in 1996